Chukwuemeka Udechukwu OA (born 10 July 1979 in Paddington, London) is an English discus thrower. "Emeka" is a nickname for the Igbo name "Chukwuemeka" (meaning "God has done great").

He was the first British athlete to win a gold medal in the men's discus at the European Under 20 Championships. This also represented Britain's first ever gold medal in the men's discus event at European, Commonwealth, World or Olympic level.

His personal best throw is 64.93 metres, achieved in July 2004 in Loughborough. This places him seventh among English discus throwers, behind Perriss Wilkins, Richard Slaney, Glen Smith, Carl Myerscough, Robert Weir and Bill Tancred.

He is an alumnus of Dulwich College.

International competitions

References

External Links

2006 Commonwealth Games profile

1979 births
Living people
British male discus throwers
English male discus throwers
Olympic athletes of Great Britain
Athletes (track and field) at the 2004 Summer Olympics
Commonwealth Games competitors for England
Athletes (track and field) at the 2002 Commonwealth Games
Athletes (track and field) at the 2006 Commonwealth Games
Athletes (track and field) at the 2010 Commonwealth Games
People educated at Dulwich College
Igbo sportspeople
Universiade medalists in athletics (track and field)
Universiade bronze medalists for Great Britain
Medalists at the 2003 Summer Universiade
English male shot putters